The World Association of Girl Guides and Girl Scouts (WAGGGS ) is a global association supporting the female-oriented and female-only Guiding and Scouting organizations in 152 countries. It was established in 1928 in Parád, Hungary, and has its headquarters in London, United Kingdom. It is the counterpart of the World Organization of the Scout Movement (WOSM). WAGGGS is organized into five regions and operates five international Guiding centers. It holds full member status in the European Youth Forum (YFJ), which operates within the Council of Europe and European Union areas and works closely with these bodies.

Mission

The mission of the WAGGGS is to enable girls and young women to reach for their potential as responsible citizens of the world.

WAGGGS provides a non-formal educational program that provides training in life skills, leadership and decision making. It also offers projects and programs at an international level that enable Girl Guides and Girl Scouts to be responsible world citizens through action and activity in the community.

WAGGGS is run by women for girls and young women. Girl Guides and Girl Scouts are trained in leadership and decision-making, and are encouraged to participate in the governance and leadership of WAGGGS. Each individual unit is democratically run with Girl Guides and Girl Scouts actively involved in leadership and in decision making.

Girl Guiding/Girl Scouting is open to all girls and young women without distinction of creed, race, nationality, or any other circumstance. WAGGGS believes that the education of girls, and the education of boys, includes education for equal partnership. Young men and young women are taught to recognize their differences and their similarities, and to respect each other as individuals.

Girl Guiding/Girl Scouting is a voluntary organisation that relies on over 100,000 volunteers around the world to implement programs for Girl Guides and Girl Scouts, and to give girls and young women support and leadership. There are over 10 million Girl Guides and Girl Scouts in 152 countries. Girl Guides and Girl Scouts from around the world can meet each other at international events at one of the five World Centers.

There are many opportunities to attend international events run by the United Nations or other non-governmental organizations on behalf of the Association. The WOSM is the non-governmental organization (NGO), that represents the Scouting movement at the United Nations. The WOSM and WAGGGS both have General Consultative Status with the United Nations Economic and Social Council.

Educational methods
Girl Guiding/Girl Scouting is based on a core set of values that are found in the Girl Guide/Girl Scout Promise and Law. Each Girl Guide and Girl Scout promises to do her best to her faith and to others, and in so doing she realizes her fullest potential as a responsible citizen.

Girl Guiding and Girl Scouting uses non-formal educational methods. Non-formal education is organized educational activity outside schools and colleges. The key components of non-formal education are that:
Young people can develop life skills and attitudes based on an integrated value system based on the Promise and Law.
Young people learn from their peer group.
Young people learn through activities and practical programs that are created by young people for young people
Young people volunteer to join non-formal education organizations that are led also by volunteers that ensure commitment and maximum learning.
Young people learn by progressive self-development through:
Learning by doing,
Teamwork though the patrol system and training for responsible leadership, and
Active cooperation between young people and adults.

Each Guide/Girl Scout defines her own progress and development according to her needs and aspirations within the framework program provided. This contrasts with many formal education systems where young people must fit themselves into a rigid structure with little recognition of individual needs and differences. The Girl Guide/Girl Scout method is the specific way that the leadership works with girls and young women to achieve the mission of WAGGGS. It is an integrated approach with certain key elements: The Girl Guiding/Girl Scouting method can be used equally effectively with girls of all ages, abilities and backgrounds. In his book "Girl Guiding," Lord Baden-Powell (1918) wrote:

"Our method of training is to educate from within rather than to instruct from without; to offer games and activities which, while being attractive to the girl, will seriously educate her morally, mentally and physically."

Since the organisation's founding, many Girl Guides and Girl Scouts have achieved positions as leading politicians, writers, businesswomen, and leaders. Senator Hillary Clinton (United States Senate), the Rt. Hon Dr. Marjorie Mowlam MP (politician in the United Kingdom), Roberta Bondar Ph.D., MD (first Canadian woman astronaut), and Betty Okwir (leading politician in Uganda) are a few former and current Girl Guides and Girl Scouts.

In 1965, Dame Leslie Whateley of the then-Girl Guides World Bureau was awarded the Bronze Wolf, the only distinction of the World Organization of the Scout Movement, awarded by the World Scout Committee for exceptional services to world Scouting.

Amongst its global initiatives, Free Being Me, a collaboration between WAGGGS and Unilever's Dove Self Esteem Project was launched in October 2013, with the aim of increasing "self-esteem and body confidence" in girls.

History
Girl Guides were formed in 1910 by Robert Baden-Powell, with the assistance of his sister Agnes Baden-Powell. After his marriage in 1912, his wife Olave Baden-Powell took a leading role in the development of Girl Guiding and Girl Scouting.

As the movement spread, independent national Guiding associations were set up; however, a need for international cooperation was felt.  Lady Baden-Powell founded an informal International Council in London in February 1918.  At the fourth World Conference held at Camp Edith Macy in 1926, representatives from several countries suggested the formation of a World Association to take the place of the informal International Council. After the 1926 International Conference the Baden-Powells were approached about setting up a formal association and in 1928 the World Association of Girl Guides and Girl Scouts was founded at the 5th International Conference held in Parád, Hungary. Rose Kerr was Vice Chairman, later Commissioner for Tenderfoot Countries. From 1930 to 1939 WAGGGS occupied a room at the headquarters of the British Girl Guide Association, until it moved to 9 Palace Street, next door to Our Ark.

In 1920, two leaders from each known Guide country were invited to the British County Commissioners Conference held at Saint Hugh's College, Oxford. This became known as the First International Conference. The 13th World Conference was held in the same college in 1950. The member organizations continue to meet every three years (initially every two years) at World Conferences.

List of chairs of the World Committee / World Board
1928–1928: Rose Kerr 
1929–1929: Esther Welmoet Wijnaendts Francken-Dyserinck
1930–1934: Helen Storrow
1935–1936: Maria Dillner
1936–1946: Marie Thérèse de Kerraoul
1946–1948: Nadine Corbett
1948–1950: Ethel J. Newton
1950–1952: Sylvi Visapää
1952–1957: Helen Means
1957–1960: Estelle Bernadotte
1960–1966: Dora Lykiardopoulo
1966–1969: Mary Nesbitt
1969–1972: Marjorie M. Culmer
1972–1975: Beryl Cozens-Hardy
1975–1981: Joyce Price
1981–1984: Helen M. Laird
1984–1987: Doris Stockmann
1987–1990: Odile Bonte
1990–1993: Barbara Hayes
1993–1996: Doris Riehm
1996–1999: Heather Brandon
1999–2002: Ginny Radford
2002–2005: Kirsty Gray
2005–2008: Elspeth Henderson
2008–2011: Margaret Treloar
2011–2014: Nadine El Achy
2014–2017: Nicola Grinstead	
2017–2020: Ana María Mideros
2020–present: Heidi Jokinen

List of directors / chief executives

Dame Katharine Furse (1926–1936) - First director
Arethusa Leigh-White (1937–1946)
Winnifred Kydd (1947–1948)
Elizabeth Fry (Acting Director 1948–1949)
M.E. Home (1949-1950)
Dame Leslie Whateley (1951–1964)
Lesley Bulman-Lever (1997–2006)
Mary McPhail (2007–2014)
Anita Tiessen (2014–2017)
David Coe (interim, August 2017–March 2018)
Sarah Nancollas (March 2018–)

World Conference

The World Conference is the governing body and meets every three years. If a country has more than one association, the associations form a federation for coordination and world representation.

Organization
WAGGGS consists of national Member Organizations which are run independently but agree to abide by the WAGGGS constitution.  The national Member Organizations are split into five regions.  The member organizations in turn elect the World Board, originally the World Committee, which governs the World Association of Girl Guides and Girl Scouts.  It is made up of  17 active volunteer members from around the world who are democratically elected by all Member Organizations and include the Chairs from each of the five WAGGGS regions.  In addition there is the permanent staff of the World Bureau based in London and headed by the WAGGGS Chief Executive (formerly Director of the World Bureau).  Every three years representatives from the member states meet in a World Conference to discuss and vote on policy. The World Committee changed its name to the World Board in 1996. The job title of the head of staff was changed from Director of the World Bureau to Chief Executive between 1964 and 1997.

Each WAGGGS Member Organization chooses how it believes it can best promote these goals, taking into account its culture and the needs of its young people. Some choose to work with girls alone in a single sex environment in order to break down stereotypes and to give girls and young women the confidence to take their place in society. Other Member Organizations prefer to work with mixed groups to enable young women and young men equal partnership within their units. Some Organizations choose to mix co-educational and single sex approaches according to the age and the preferences of the young people.

World regions

The World Association of Girl Guides and Girl Scouts has five regions: Europe, Arab, Africa, Asia and Western Hemisphere.

World Centres

WAGGGS operates five World Centres that offer training programmes, activities and lodging for girls and leaders, as well as members of some other groups and independent travellers. Activities are primarily focused on international friendship and cooperation, personal development and leadership training, enjoyment and service. The Friends of the Four World Centres organisation supports and promotes the centres.

The five World Centres are:
 Our Chalet, in Adelboden, Switzerland; opened in 1932.
 Pax Lodge, in Hampstead, London, England; current location opened in 1990. It is actually London's third World Centre; the first was Our Ark, opened in 1937, which was renamed Olave House on its 25th anniversary.
 Our Cabaña, in Cuernavaca, Mexico; opened in 1957.
 Sangam, in Pune, Maharashtra, India; opened in 1966.
 Kusafiri, moving between cities Africa; opened in 2010
A  new centre, Kusafiri, meaning “to journey” in Swahili,  was announced in 2015.  Unlike the other centres it will be a roving centre and exist for a fixed period of time in different places with a particular theme in Africa.  While testing the idea, starting in 2012, the country organizations involved include Ghana, South Africa, Rwanda, Kenya, Nigeria, and Benin.  Focuses so far have included “Stopping the Violence” training in Rwanda and developing entrepreneurial leaders among others.

World Trefoil

Miss Kari Aas designed the World Trefoil emblem that was adopted at the World Conference in 1930, a gold trefoil on a blue background.

The three leaves represent the three duties and the three parts of the promise, the two five point-stars stand for the promise and the law and the vein in the centre represents the compass needle showing the right way. The base of the trefoil stands for the flame of the love of humanity and the colours blue and gold represent the sun shining over all children in the world.

The World Badge, incorporating the trefoil, was first adopted at the 11th World Conference in Evian, France in 1946.

The World Association Badge, similar in design to the World Badge, was first adopted at the 7th World Conference in Bucze, near Górki Wielkie in Poland, in 1932. It is worn by members of the World Board, its Committees, World Bureau and World Centre staff.

See also
 List of World Association of Girl Guides and Girl Scouts members
 World Board
 World Citizenship Award

References

Scouting Round the World, John S. Wilson, first edition, Blandford Press 1959 page 203.

External links
World Association of Girl Guides and Girl Scouts website
Olave Baden-Powell Society
WAGGGS Web Ring
Differences in Fundamental Principles of WOSM and WAGGGS

 
Girl Guiding and Girl Scouting
International Scouting organizations
Youth organizations established in 1928
International women's organizations